Shikha is a village development committee in Myagdi District in the Dhaulagiri Zone of western-central Nepal. At the time of the 1991 Nepal census it had a population of 5862 people living in 1350 individual households.

The VDC includes the village of Ghorepani, a popular stop for trekkers on the Annapurna Circuit trek, and the Poon Hill viewpoint.

References

External links
UN map of the municipalities of Myagdi District

Populated places in Myagdi District